Cao Yunding (born 22 November 1989) is a Chinese footballer who currently plays as a right-footed left winger for Shanghai Shenhua in the Chinese Super League.

Club career
Cao Yunding started his football career when he joined the Genbao Football Academy in 2000 and was promoted to Shanghai East Asia's first team during the 2006 season. He scored his first goal for the club on 20 August 2006 in a 4-1 win against Wuhan Yaqi. Cao established himself as a regular in the team as the club won third tier title and promotion to the second tier during the 2007 season. In the 2009 season, the club became genuine promotion candidates and Cao played twenty-two games and scored two goals as Shanghai finished fourth and narrowly missed out on promotion. Cao made another twenty appearances and scored two goals during the 2010 season as he helped guide the club to another fourth-place finish.

On 12 February 2011, Cao transferred to Chinese Super League side Shanghai Shenhua. He made his debut for the club on 2 March 2011 in a 0-0 draw against Kashima Antlers in the 2011 AFC Champions League. He scored his first goal for the club on 21 September 2011 in a 1-0 win against Yanbian Baekdu Tigers in the 2011 Chinese FA Cup. He then scored his first league goal for the club on 24 September 2011 in a 3-2 loss against Jiangsu Sainty. He extended his contract with the club for five more years on 19 November 2017.

International career
Cao made his debut for the Chinese national team on 15 November 2016 in a 0-0 draw against Qatar.

Career statistics

Club statistics
.

International statistics

Honours

Club
Shanghai East Asia
China League Two: 2007
Shanghai Shenhua
Chinese FA Cup: 2017, 2019

Individual
Chinese FA Cup Most Valuable Player: 2017

References

External links
Personal Weibo page at Weibo.com

Player profile at Sodasoccer.com
Player profile at Sohu.com

1989 births
Living people
Chinese footballers
Footballers from Shanghai
Shanghai Port F.C. players
Shanghai Shenhua F.C. players
Chinese Super League players
China League One players
China League Two players
Association football midfielders
China international footballers
21st-century Chinese people